"Come Get Some" is a song by English indie rock band Rooster, featured on their self-titled debut album (2005). Written by vocalist Nick Atkinson and producers Charlie Grant and Peter Woodroffe, the song was released as the lead single from the album on 11 October 2004, reaching number seven on the UK Singles Chart and topping the UK Rock Chart. It was also a hit in Australasia in 2005, peaking at number 38 in Australia and number 22 in New Zealand. In Ireland, the song was less successful, reaching number 46.

In 2011, Reece Mastin, who won the third series of the Australian version of The X Factor, covered this song on his first audition.

Track listings
All songs were written by Nick Atkinson, Charlie Grant, and Peter Woodroffe except "You're So Right for Me" by Atkinson, Luke Potashnick, Chris Griffiths, and Tony Griffiths.

UK CD1 and 7-inch single
 "Come Get Some" 
 "Come Get Some" 

UK CD2
 "Come Get Some"
 "Come Get Some" 
 Album sampler: "Platinum Blind", "To Die For", "You're So Right for Me"
 "Come Get Some"

Charts

Weekly charts

Year-end charts

References

2004 debut singles
2004 songs
Rooster (band) songs
Songs written by Nick Atkinson